The Bronson Hill Arc is a bimodal volcanic arc and associated sediments that formed over a west (?) dipping subduction zone during the Ordovician period (c. 475 - 450 million years ago (Ma)) as part of the Taconic Orogeny. These rocks are presently well exposed along the Connecticut River Valley of Vermont and New Hampshire. The arc is evidenced by plutonism and extrusive volcanicsm, including the Ammonoosuc Volcanics (c. 461 Ma from U/Pb zircon dates) and the overlying Partridge Formation (c. 457 Ma from graptolites in the formation). It is related to the slightly older Shelburne Falls arc that sits to the west. These rocks were metamorphosed and deformed during the Acadian Orogeny and the Alleghenian Orogeny.

References

Robert H. Moench and John N. Aleinikoff, "Stratigraphy, Geochronology, and Accretionary Terrane Settings of Two Bronson Hill Arc Sequences, Northern New England", Physics and Chemistry of the Earth, Parts A/B/C, Volume 27, Issues 1–3, January 2002, pages 47–95.

Geology of New Hampshire
Geology of Vermont
Terranes